Cadborosaurus, nicknamed Caddy by journalist Archie Wills, is a sea serpent in the folklore of regions of the Pacific Coast of North America. Its name is derived from Cadboro Bay in Greater Victoria, British Columbia, and the Greek root word "saurus" meaning lizard or reptile.

Description

Cadborosaurus willsi is said by witnesses to resemble a serpent with vertical coils or humps in tandem behind the horse-like head and long neck, with a pair of small elevating front flippers, and either a pair of hind flippers, or a pair of large webbed hind flippers fused to form a large fan-like tail region that provides forward propulsion.

Dr. Paul LeBlond, director of Earth and Ocean Sciences at UBC, and Dr. Edward Blousfield, retired chief zoologist of the Canadian Museum of Nature, state every elongated animal has been put forward as an explanation for Caddy. These animals include Conger eels, humpback whales, elephant seals, ribbon or oarfish, basking sharks, and sea lions. LeBlond and Blousfield state no known creature matches the characteristics found in over 200 sightings collected over a century, noting that Caddy is described as having flippers both anteriorly and posteriorly. Darren Naish contends that LeBlond and Blousfield are engaging in "bad science" and have incorrectly assumed that different, conflicting eyewitness reports are all descriptions of one species when various accounts "are most parsimoniously interpreted as descriptions of many things."

Creatures identified as Cadborosaurus

Sea lion
In 1943, two police officers, Inspector Robert Owens, and Staff Sergeant Jack Russell, saw a "huge sea serpent with a horse-like head" in Georgia Strait. Later, "with a pair of binoculars, Sgt. Russell saw that the strange apparition was a huge bull sea lion leading a herd of six sea lions... Their undulations as they swam appeared to form a continuous body, with parts showing at intervals as they surfaced and dived. To the naked eye, the sight perfectly impersonated a sea monster."

Giant oarfish
Some suggestions have been made that Caddy could be an example of the king of herrings or giant oarfish (Regalecus glesne). "They're long and silvery and they undulate like a serpent would as they swim through the water," said H. J. Walker, a senior museum scientist at the Scripps Institution of Oceanography, which has several oarfish in its collection.

Basking shark
The carcass of a decomposing basking shark is often mistaken for Caddy and has fooled experts and laymen. A rotting basking shark may also resemble a decomposing plesiosaur.

First Nations accounts
A native image that fits Caddy's description has been traditionally used throughout Alaska. The image indicates that Caddy or a Caddy-like creature moves north to Vancouver when the waters warm. The Inuit of Alaska has even put the picture on their canoes to keep the creature away. The Cadborosaurus is called hiyitl'iik by the Manhousat people who live on Sydney Inlet, t'chain-ko in Sechelt mythology, and numkse lee kwala by the Comox band of Vancouver Island.

Sightings
There have been more than 300 claimed sightings during the past 200 years, including Deep Cove in Saanich Inlet, and Island View Beach, both of which are also on the Saanich Peninsula, and at San Francisco Bay, California.

Kelly Nash video
In 2009, fisherman Kelly Nash purportedly filmed several minutes of footage featuring ten to fifteen (including young) creatures in Nushagak Bay. In 2011, a very short segment of the footage was shown on the Discovery TV show Hilstranded, where the Hilstrand brothers (from Deadliest Catch) apparently saw Nash's footage and unsuccessfully attempted to find one of the creatures.

Carcasses associated with Cadborosaurus

1930: On 10 November at Glacier Island near Valdez a skeleton was found in ice. Some of the remains were preserved in Cordova for scientific study. The creature is thought to be a whale.
Dr. Neal Carter examined the remains. Creature identified as basking shark.
1937: In October a purported Cadborosaurus carcass was retrieved from the stomach of a sperm whale in Naden Harbour and photographed. A sample of this carcass was sent to the BC Provincial Museum, where it was tentatively identified as a fetal baleen whale by museum director Francis Kermode.
1941: A carcass called "Sarah the sea hag" was found on Kitsilano Beach. W.A. Clemens and Ian McTaggart-Cowan identified it as a shark.
1947: In December at Vernon Bay, Barkley Sound, Vancouver Island a  creature was found. It was identified as a shark.
1950: In Delake, Oregon a creature was found with 4 tails and thick hair. It was identified as a whale shark.
Trevor Kincaid is quoted as saying "description fits no known creature." W.A. Clemens identified the carcass as a Baird's beaked whale.
1962: In April near Ucluelet a 14-foot long carcass was found with elephant like head. The carcass was dragged ashore by Simon Peter and later thought to be an elephant seal.
1963: In September near Oak Harbor, Whidbey Island a carcass was found with a head resembling a horse. A. D. Welander of Fisheries thought it was a basking shark.

Purported live capture

1968:  In August, W. Hagelund claims to have caught a baby Caddy near De Courcy Island only to return it to the water.
1991: In July, on Johns Island (San Juan Islands), Phyllis Harsh claims to have caught a small,  baby Caddy and returned it to the water.

References 

 Bousfield, E. L., & P. H. LeBlond (1995). "An account of Cadborosaurus willsi, new genus, new species, a large aquatic reptile from the Pacific coast of North America". Amphipacifica Vol 1 Suppl. 1: pp. 1–25, 19 figs.
 Jupp, Ursula. (1988, reprinted 1993). Cadboro: A Ship, A Bay, A Sea-Monster. Jay Editions.

External links
2009 MSNBC Article

Canadian folklore
Coast of British Columbia
Culture of British Columbia
Canadian legendary creatures
Water monsters
Globsters
Sea serpents